Atakunmosa East (Yoruba: Ilaorun Atakunmosa) is a Local Government Area in Osun State, Nigeria. Its headquarters are in the town of Iperindo in the east of the area at.

It has an area of 238 km and a population of 76,197 at the 2006 census.

The postal code of the area is 233.

References

Local Government Areas in Osun State